This is a list of colleges and universities in Hawaii. This list also includes other accredited educational institutions providing higher education, meaning tertiary, quaternary, and, in some cases, post-secondary education.

Institutions

Four-year Institutions

Two-year Institutions 
 Hawaii Tokai International College, Kapolei

Former Institutions

See also

 List of college athletic programs in Hawaii
 Higher education in the United States
 Lists of American institutions of higher education
 List of recognized higher education accreditation organizations
 Lists of universities and colleges
 Lists of universities and colleges by country

References

External links
Department of Education listing of accredited institutions in Hawaii

 
Hawaii, List of colleges and universities in
Universities and colleges